Hymenogramme is a fungal genus in the family Polyporaceae. It is a monotypic genus, containing the single species Hymenogramme javensis.

References

Polyporaceae
Monotypic Polyporales genera
Taxa named by Miles Joseph Berkeley
Taxa described in 1844